The Tour Incity is a skyscraper office in Lyon, France. The building was completed in 2015 in the business district of La Part-Dieu, at the intersection of the Cours Lafayette (main entrance) and Garibaldi Street to replace the obsolete UAP tower. The tower is the tallest building in Greater Lyon.

Transports 
The tower is connected to the rest of the city by the metro line , tramways T1, T3, T4 and the tram-train airport commuter Rhônexpress.

References

External links

See also

 Lyon business districts 
 Sustainable architecture
 La Part-Dieu

3rd arrondissement of Lyon
Skyscrapers in Lyon
Skyscraper office buildings in France